The 1883 Rutgers Queensmen football team represented Rutgers University in the 1883 college football season. The Queensmen compiled a 1–6 record and were outscored by their opponents, 255 to 54. The team had no coach, and its captain was Charles Pattison.

Schedule

References

Rutgers
Rutgers Scarlet Knights football seasons
Rutgers Queensmen football